The Good Hope is a 1964 novel by the Faroese writer William Heinesen, and set in 17th-century Tórshavn. It received the Nordic Council Literature Prize. Heinesen wrote in the Danish language, but his novels, including The Good Hope, were later translated into the Faroese language.

See also
 1964 in literature
 Faroese literature

References

1964 Danish novels
Faroese literature
Novels set in the 17th century
Novels set in the Faroe Islands
Gyldendal books
Nordic Council's Literature Prize-winning works